Automotive industry in Korea may refer to:

 Automotive industry in North Korea
 Automotive industry in South Korea